Castillo de Locubín is a village located in the south-western corner of the province of Jaén, in Andalucia, Spain. According to the 2006 census (INE), the village has a population of 5000.

Castillo de Locubín is a pueblo blanco or "white village", so named for the white-washed external walls of the houses. It is located in the foothills of the Sierra Sur. The Moorish castle is in ruins. The 16th-century church is dedicated to St Peter the Apostle. Castillo's main local crafts are pottery and ceramics. During the first week in June, a cherry fair to celebrate the cherry harvest is held, with  competitions for the best liqueurs, desserts and cuisine based on the cherry. Castillo is 11 kilometers north of Alcalá la Real and 2 km from the N432 main road. Monday is market day.

References

Municipalities in the Province of Jaén (Spain)